The Nice Jazz Festival, held annually since 1948 in Nice, on the French Riviera, is "the first jazz festival of international significance." At the inaugural festival, Louis Armstrong and his All Stars were the headliners. Frommer's calls it "the biggest, flashiest, and most prestigious jazz festival in Europe." From 1974 it was known as La Grande Parade du Jazz; in 1980 the name changed to JVC Nice Jazz Festival; since 1993 it has been known as the Nice Jazz Festival.

During the festival, several artists were present : Louis Armstrong, George Barnes, Barney Bigard, Ruby Braff, Francis Burger, Sid Catlett, Suzy Delair, Baby Dodds, Challain Ferret, Stéphane Grappelli, Earl Hines, Jean Leclère, Claude Luter, Mezz Mezzrow, Velma Middleton, Yves Montand, Michael Moore, Joseph Reinhardt, Arvell Shaw, Jimmy Skidmore, Emmanuel Soudieux, Rex Stewart, Jack Teagarden, Louis Vola, and Wayne Wright (musician).

February 28, 1948, Suzy Delair sang C'est si bon in the Hotel Negresco during this Festival. Louis Armstrong was present and loved the song. June 26, 1950, he recorded the American version of the song (English lyrics by Jerry Seelen) in New York City with Sy Oliver and his Orchestra. When it was released, the disc was a worldwide success and the song was then performed by the greatest international singers. The festival was called Grande Parade du Jazz from 1974 to 1993.

Over the years, many artists, such as Lionel Hampton, Dizzy Gillespie, Ray Charles, Ella Fitzgerald, Helen Humes, Herbie Hancock, and Miles Davis, regularly appeared at the festival. After 1994, it saw a change of emphasis, with more world music and pop. But the festival's newest organizer, Vivian Sicnasi, has reinstated an eclectic mix of traditional and modern sounds with an  international line-up; it remains "one of the Riviera's biggest annual events."

Set in the vast Jardins de Cimiez (which contains a Roman amphitheatre), the event features several separate stages where groups perform simultaneously each evening, for eight days in July.

In 2011, following years of falling attendance, the festival was moved from Cimiez to the more centrally located Place Masséna. It was reported that about 30,000 spectators attended the five-day festival in 2011.  The 2012 festival took place from July 8–12 and performers included Herbie Hancock, Dee Dee Bridgewater, Erykah Badu, Sharon Jones & the Dap-Kings, Gregory Porter and the Jimi Brown Experience.

The 2016 Festival, scheduled to begin on 16 July, was cancelled in the wake of the truck attack on 14 July 2016.

References

External links

  Nice Jazz Festival official site
FR2DAY Music

Jazz festivals in France
Culture of Nice
Tourist attractions in Nice
1948 establishments in France
Music festivals established in 1948